Whitcomb Ridge is a high, ice-covered ridge along the south side of the head of Gair Glacier, standing 6 nautical miles (11 km) southeast of Mount Supernal in the Mountaineer Range of Victoria Land. Mapped by United States Geological Survey (USGS) from surveys and U.S. Navy air photos, 1960–64. Named by Advisory Committee on Antarctic Names (US-ACAN) for Jean P. Whitcomb, radio scientist at McMurdo Station, 1965–66 and 1966–67.

Ridges of Victoria Land
Borchgrevink Coast